Tathawade is a developing area in the city of Pune. It is a fast growing educational hub constituting many colleges such as JSPM Institutes, Dr. D. Y. Patil Biotechnology & Bioinformatics Institute, Global Business School & Research Centre, Dr. D. Y. Patil B-School and Dr. D. Y. Patil Institute of Hotel Management & Catering Technology and Indira Group of Institutes. It is next to Wakad (4Km) and Bhumkar chowk (2Km). It is popular for its rare Lord Narsinh Temple.

Towards the East are Thergaon (4Km) and Kalewadi (6 Km), towards the South are Wakad and Hinjawadi (5 Km), Towards the North are Walhekarwadi and Chinchwad, and Towards the West are suburban areas of Punawale (1Km) and Ravet (4Km).

History 
Tathawade was a small, underdeveloped village before being included in the Pimpri-Chinchwad Municipal Corporation (PCMC), but had many small-scale industries. Earlier it was ruled by a sarpanch. Prior to its development, most of the inhabitants were farmers.

Economy 
The soil was mostly black-soil, which resulted in good crop production for the farmers. 
Because of the development of nearby Hinjawadi IT Park, real estate demand escalated and this area developed accordingly.

Demographics 
The region was populated mostly by people with the 'Pawar' surname who were local landlords. But now many new and modern societies have cosmopolitan crowd from all parts of the country.

Transport 
This area has the Bus Rapid Transit System (BRTS). The Kiwale-Sangvi route of BRTS runs through this area.

National Highway-4 (NH-4)  connects the nearby villages to the Rajiv Gandhi Infotech Park in Hinjawadi.

Government

Education 
It is the educational hub of Pimpri-Chinchwad City.

Schools  
 Blossom Public School
 Indira National School
 Akshara International School
 Indira Kids
 Ashwini International School
 Pune District Primary School
 Podar International school

Colleges 
 JSPM Group of Institutes
Jayawant Institute of Management Studies
Rajarshi Shahu College of Pharmacy and Research
 Indira Group of Institutes
 Sri Balaji Society's Law College
 Sri Balaji Society's Junior College of Arts, Commerce and Science
 Dr. D.Y. Patil Institute of Hotel Management & Catering Technology

Neighbourhoods in Pimpri-Chinchwad